KRIO (910 AM) is a radio station  broadcasting a Spanish-language Christian radio format. Licensed to McAllen, Texas, US, the station serves the McAllen-Brownsville-Harlingen area.  The station is currently owned by Rio Grande Bible Institute, Inc.

KRIO has a long and colorful history.  During the 1960s and early 1970s, it was "The Big 9-10," a Top 40 formatted station emphasizing fun promotions and popular personalities in a fast-paced presentation with station jingles and other production elements.  It was one of the top stations in south Texas until it was challenged first by KRGV-AM "The Enormous 129" licensed to Weslaco and then KBFM-FM "KB-104" licensed to Edinburg.  Toward the end of the decade KRIO was managed by Charlie Trub who started two stations in the Valley, KRIX-FM and XHRIO-TV.  KRIX was an automated album oriented rock station on 99.5 FM in Brownsville, while XHRIO broadcast on Channel 2 from El Control, Tamaulipas but originated its programs from studios adjacent to the KRIO radio station in McAllen.

KRIO was purchased by Henry Tippie from Charlie Trub. Tippie already owned KVLY FM, formerly KESI FM, in Edinburg, Texas. Tippie had hoped to regain KRIO's popularity with a "Classic" oldies format playing "The music you grew up with".  After a few years, when the station was not performing as expected, the station was donated to the Rio Grande Bible Institute as a tax write off.

KRIO's programming is also heard on KRIO-FM 97.7 FM in Roma, Texas and KOIR 88.5 FM in Edinburg, Texas.

References

External links

RIO
Mass media in McAllen, Texas
RIO